USS Henley (DD-762), an , was the fourth ship of the United States Navy to be named Henley, was named after Captain Robert Henley (5 January 1783 – 7 October 1828); an officer in the United States Navy during the Quasi-War with France, the War of 1812 and the Second Barbary War.

In addition to the three destroyers named USS Henley, there was an additional ship, named  which was named after Captain John D. Henley, a brother of Captain Robert Henley.

The fourth Henley (DD-762) was launched on 8 April 1945 by Bethlehem Steel Co., San Francisco; sponsored by Mrs. George S. Wheaton; and commissioned on 8 October 1946.

History
After shakedown in the Pacific, Henley headed east, reporting to the Sonar School at Key West on 19 February 1947 for a five-month tour of duty. She then reported to Norfolk, Virginia from which she sailed 28 July for her first Mediterranean cruise, which terminated on 1 December at Boston. On her second tour in the Mediterranean, Henley patrolled with other United Nations ships in the summer of 1948 as the Israeli-Arab dispute threatened to erupt into war. After a year of tactical training exercises and fleet maneuvers, Henley decommissioned at Charleston, South Carolina on 15 March 1950. Less than six months later, with the outbreak of war in Korea, Henley went back in commission, rejoining the active fleet 23 September. Shakedown over, she sailed July 1951 for another tour with the 6th Fleet in the Mediterranean. Henley was detached from this duty and made a cruise to northern European ports, including a journey up the Seine to Rouen, before returning to Norfolk in February 1952.

In company with Destroyer Division 221, Henley departed Norfolk on 25 September 1953 for a world cruise which was to take her 44,000 miles in 218 days. During this period, Henley sailed through the Mediterranean and the Suez Canal, participated in the filming of "The Bridges of Toko-Ri" off the Korean and Japanese coasts, operated with the 7th Fleet in Asian waters, and returned to the States via the Panama Canal and the Caribbean. Following years fell into a pattern for Henley as she alternated Mediterranean cruises with anti-submarine warfare and other tactical exercises off the East Coast and in the Caribbean. In 1959 she joined Task Force 47 for the Inland Seas Cruise to the Great Lakes through the newly completed St. Lawrence Seaway. Nearly 75,000 mid-westerners visited this representative of the "salt-water navy" in her two-month cruise.

During the Cuban Missile Crisis in the fall of 1962 over offensive missiles stationed in Cuba, Henley joined the fleet "quarantining" the island. Following this, she then returned to a peacetime pattern of readiness operations.

On 1 October 1964, Henley became a Group I, Naval Reserve training ship assigned to the Anti-Submarine Warfare Component of the Naval Reserve. Following overhaul at Newport News, Virginia, and refresher training at Guantanamo Bay, Cuba, she began the first of numerous Naval Reserve training cruises out of Norfolk 1 May 1965. Manned by a nucleus crew of 100 officers and men on active duty, she cruised along the Atlantic Coast and into the Caribbean during the next eight years and provided valuable service as an at-sea training platform for hundreds of Naval Reservists. Into mid-1972 she continued this vital duty for officers and men of the Naval Reserve and the Nation and on July 2, 1973, the last all gun Sumner class destroyer remaining in the fleet was decommissioned.

References

External links  
   navsource.org: USS Henley
        hazegray.org: USS Henley

 

Cold War destroyers of the United States
Ships built in San Francisco
1945 ships
Allen M. Sumner-class destroyers of the United States Navy